The List Project is a non-profit foundation that was established on June 20, 2007. It assists Iraqi refugees who have worked for U.S-affiliated organizations throughout the Iraqi war in obtaining visas and relocating to the U.S. 
It is recognized as a U.S. 501(c)(3) non-profit organization under the Tides Center.

Founding
The founder Kirk Johnson, was a "former USAID worker who served as regional coordinator on reconstruction in Fallujah throughout 2005." After being contacted by an Iraqi colleague with whom he served, Johnson wrote an article in the Los Angeles Times lamenting the delays in visa handling for these interpreters. This article resulted in a surge of letters from other Iraqi interpreters and prompted the creation of The List Project.

See also 
 The List (2012 film)

References

External links

Iraq War
Veterans' organizations
Refugee aid organizations in the United States
Organizations established in 2007
2007 establishments in the United States
501(c)(3) organizations